Gerardus Christianus (Ger) Senden (born 9 July 1971) is a retired Dutch footballer, who played as a right back.

He was born in Heerlen, and played for Roda JC from 1989 to 2008, earning the honorary nickname Mister Roda JC. He played more than 400 matches for the club before retiring from the game in May 2008. With Roda JC, Senden won the KNVB Beker (Dutch Cup) twice in (1996–97 and 1999–2000), scoring in the 1997 KNVB Cup Final.

Honours
Roda JC
KNVB Cup: 1996–97, 1999–2000

See also
List of one-club men

References

1971 births
Living people
Dutch footballers
Association football defenders
Roda JC Kerkrade players
Eredivisie players
Sportspeople from Heerlen
Footballers from Limburg (Netherlands)
20th-century Dutch people
21st-century Dutch people